Oakland Township is a township in Susquehanna County, Pennsylvania, United States. The population was 492 at the 2020 census.

History
Oakland Township was once part of Harmony Township (not to be confused with Harmony Borough in Butler County). Oakland Township was formed from the west part of Harmony Township on December 3, 1853.  Oakland Borough was later incorporated from part of Oakland Township in 1883.

Emma Hale Smith, wife of Latter-day Saint Movement founder Joseph Smith, grew up in Oakland Township when it was still part of Harmony Township.  During the same time,  Joseph lived in Oakland Township and boarded with Emma's family while he was employed by Josiah Stowell.  The Aaronic Priesthood Restoration Site preserves the location of their home.

Geography

Demographics

2000 census
At the 2000 census there were 550 people, 227 households, and 153 families living in the township.  The population density was 33.5 people per square mile (12.9/km2).  There were 281 housing units at an average density of 17.1/sq mi (6.6/km2).  The racial makeup of the township was 99.27% White, 0.36% from other races, and 0.36% from two or more races. Hispanic or Latino of any race were 1.45%.

Of the 227 households 30.8% had children under the age of 18 living with them, 53.7% were married couples living together, 7.5% had a female householder with no husband present, and 32.2% were non-families. 26.4% of households were one person and 12.3% were one person aged 65 or older.  The average household size was 2.42 and the average family size was 2.86.

The age distribution was 24.4% under the age of 18, 6.4% from 18 to 24, 24.5% from 25 to 44, 26.5% from 45 to 64, and 18.2% 65 or older.  The median age was 41 years. For every 100 females there were 102.2 males.  For every 100 females age 18 and over, there were 97.2 males.

The median household income was $28,438 and the median family income  was $38,750. Males had a median income of $29,688 versus $22,321 for females. The per capita income for the township was $15,820.  About 9.4% of families and 17.0% of the population were below the poverty line, including 24.6% of those under age 18 and 6.1% of those age 65 or over.

2010 census
As of the census of 2010, there were 564 people, 232 households, and 161 families living in the township.  The population density was 34.3 people per square mile (13.2/km2).  There were 285 housing units at an average density of 17.3/sq mi (6.8/km2).  The racial makeup of the township was 96.3% White, 0.5% Black, 0.5% American Indian, 1.2% Asian, 0.2% Pacific Islander, and 1.2% from two or more races. Hispanic or Latino of any race were 1.2% of the population.

Of the 232 households 26.3% had children under the age of 18 living with them, 53.9% were married couples living together, 7.3% had a female householder with no husband present, and 30.6% were non-families. 25.9% of households were one person and 14.2% were one person aged 65 or older.  The average household size was 2.43 and the average family size was 2.85.

The age distribution was 20% under the age of 18, 60.9% from 18 to 64, and 19.1% 65 or older.  The median age was 47 years.

The median household income was $55,865 and the median family income  was $63,417. Males had a median income of $40,599 versus $24,333 for females. The per capita income for the township was $25,326.  About 3.6% of families and 7.4% of the population were below the poverty line, including 10.9% of those under age 18 and none of those age 65 or over.

Communities and locations of Oakland Township 
Brushville – Hamlet South of the Susquehanna Depot.
Hilborn – A tiny locality on Hilborn Creek and Hilborn Road.
Outter Bank – A trailer park community next to Penn-can Track.
Oakland Center – riverside community across Lanesboro holding the Township building.

References

Populated places established in 1787
Townships in Susquehanna County, Pennsylvania